Sangwan is a surname of Indian origin.

Notable people with the name include:

Kishan Singh Sangwan (born 1948), Indian politician, member of the 14th Lok Sabha
Pradeep Sangwan (born 1990), Indian cricketer
Rambir Singh Sangwan, Indian constable and kabaddi player
Sumit Sangwan (born 1993), Indian amateur boxer
Usha Sangwan, Indian businesswoman